HMS LST-429 was a United States Navy  that was transferred to the Royal Navy during World War II. As with many of her class, the ship was never named. Instead, she was referred to by her hull designation.

Construction
LST-429 was laid down on 16 November 1942, under Maritime Commission (MARCOM) contract, MC hull 949, by the Bethlehem Fairfield Shipyard, Baltimore, Maryland; launched 11 January 1943; then transferred to the United Kingdom and commissioned on 20 February 1943.

Service history 
The ship was sunk due to a fire while in Royal Navy service in July 1943, northwest of Zuwarah, Libya. On 24 November 1943, LST-429 was struck from the Navy list.

The wreck is located at:

See also 
 List of United States Navy LSTs

Notes

Citations

Bibliography 

Online resources

External links

 

Ships built in Baltimore
1943 ships
LST-1-class tank landing ships of the Royal Navy
World War II amphibious warfare vessels of the United Kingdom
S3-M2-K2 ships
Maritime incidents in July 1943